This is a list of public art in Copenhagen, Denmark. This list applies only to works of public art on permanent display in an outdoor public space. For example, this does not include artworks in museums.

City (Indre By)

Frederiksberg

Nørrebro

Østerbro

Vesterbro/Kongens Enghave

Amager

Bispebjerg

Brønshøj-Husum

Valby

Vanløse

Suburbs

Gentofte Municipality

Hørsholm Municipality

Hvidovre Municipality

Lyngby-Taarbæk Municipality

Rudersdal Municipality

References

External links
 List of works owned by Copenhagen Municipality
 Source
 På sporet af skulpturene i Kyngby-Taarbæk Kommune
 Mindetavler
 Source

 
Art
Copenhagen